Barbara Stühlmeyer OblOSB (born 12 November 1964) is a German theologian, musicologist, author, especially a Hildegard scholar and a science journalism.

Biography
Stühlmeyer was born in Bremen. After completing her A levels at the Altes Gymnasium in Bremen and her organ studies with church music director Winfrid Langosz, whom she assisted at the Catholic Provost church St. John's Bremen, she studied Christian music at the University of the Arts Bremen (Diploma 1988). During her scientific studies from 1988 to 1994 she studied Catholic theology with Arnold Angenendt and Klemens Richter, philosophy with Berthhold Wald and musicology with Axel Beer and Winfried Schepporst at the Westfaelische Wilhelms Universitaet in Muenster. 2004 she graduated at Münster with a doctorate of philosophy with summa cum laude. Additionally, she studied Gregorian semiology with Luigi Agustoni, Godehard Joppich and Johannes Berchmans Göschl.

Her doctoral dissertation Die Gesänge von Hildegard von Bingen is a standard work of music related Hildegard-research. For the first time, it proves that the diastematic Neume script (written on staves) is of rhythmical significance. Prior to this, Hildegard's compositions had been interpreted equalistically or mensuralistically. Stühlmeyer demonstrated that Hildegard's tone language and the ambitus, spanning up to two octaves, both meet professional, compositional standards of the 12th century. Her scientific work proved that the parameters of the Regula Benedicti influenced her formal concept of composition. This fuelled the prove that the songs were used within liturgy. Her theological research of the Ordo virtutum illustrates that Hildegard mirrors here the denethic discourse of the 12th century with its protagonists Petrus Abaelarus, Anselm of Canterbury and Rupert of Deutz. For the research project 'Music and Gender on the Internet', headed by prof. Beatrix Bochard, she authored the 'Grundseite' about Hildegard's music.

From 1993 to 2001 she was conference chairwoman at the Catholic academy St.-Jabobus-Haus in Goslar. Since 1995 she is contributor and editor of the journal Karfunkel, where she accounts for the categories music and medievalism as well since 2005 as permanent freelancer for different magazines. Furthermore, she was editor of the scientific journal Musica sacra, published in Bärenreiter Verlag from 2010 to 2015. As a scientific consultant, she oversees CD productions, e.g. of the ensembles Sequentia and Benjamin Bagby, Ars Chorals Coeln with Maria Jonas, and Cosmedian, Stuttgart with Stephanie and Christoph Haas. For radio and television as well as international exhibitions, she works as mediaeval expert. Moreover, she is involved in numerous book publications.

She lives in Hof (Bavaria), is married to cantor and composer Ludger Stühlmeyer and mother of Lea Stühlmeyer. Since 2002 she is oblate of the Benedictine abbey St. Hildegard's in Rüdesheim am Rhein.

Honours
 In 2019 she was awarded the Certificate of Honour of the Roman Catholic Archdiocese of Bamberg.

Publications

Books 
 Die Gesänge der Hildegard von Bingen : Eine musikologische, theologische und kulturhistorische Untersuchung. Olms, Hildesheim 2003, .
 In einem Meer von Licht : Heilende Gesänge der Hildegard von Bingen. Illustrated by Sabine Böhm. Butzon & Bercker, Kevelaer 2004, .
 Neue Freunde sind was Tolles. Illustrated by Nadine Lentzen. Verlag Haus Altenberg, Düsseldorf 2010,  and Verlag Butzon & Bercker, Kevelaer 2011, .
 Das Leben singen. Together with Ludger Stühlmeyer. Verlag DeBehr, Radeberg 2011, .
 Engel – die andere Wirklichkeit. Illustrated by Sabine Böhm. Verlag DeBehr, Radeberg 2011, .
 Hildegard von Bingen : Werke Band IV. Lieder Symphoniae. Beuroner Kunstverlag 2012. .
 Tugenden und Laster : Wegweisung im Dialog mit Hildegard von Bingen. Illustrated by Sabine Böhm. Beuroner Kunstverlag 2012. . 
 Be-Stimmung : Unterwegs zur Stimme und zu sich selbst. Together with Gottfried Hoffmann. Verlag DeBehr, Radeberg 2012, .
 Die Geheimschrift : Mit Hildegard von Bingen auf Spurensuche (Crime novel for children). Verlag Haus Altenberg,  and Butzon & Bercker,  Düsseldorf/Kevelaer 2013.
 Bernhard Lichtenberg : Ich werde meinem Gewissen folgen. Together with Ludger Stühlmeyer. Topos plus Verlagsgemeinschaft, Kevelaer 2013, . Sponsored by the Wolfgang-Siegel-Stiftung.
 Wege in sein Licht : Eine spirituelle Biografie über Hildegard von Bingen. Beuroner Kunstverlag, Beuron 2013, .
 Hildegard von Bingen : Leben – Werk – Verehrung. Topos plus Verlagsgemeinschaft, Kevelaer 2014, .
 Johann Valentin Rathgeber : Leben und Werk. Verlag Sankt Michaelsbund, München 2016, .
 Heilende Lebenskräfte. Wege zu einem freieren Leben. Beuroner Kunstverlag 2017, .
 Elisabeth von Thüringen : Spiritualität – Geschichte – Wirkung. Topos Plus Verlagsgemeinschaft, Kevelaer 2018, .
 Das Turiner Grabtuch : Faszination und Fakten. Together with Archbishop Karl Braun, Butzon & Bercker Kevelaer 2018, .
 Pendel, Steine, Nervenkekse : Esoterik im Gespräch mit Hildegard von Bingen. Together with Archbishop Karl Braun, Butzon & Bercker, Kevelaer 2019, .
 Auf Christus getauft : Glauben leben und verkünden im 21. Jahrhundert. Butzon & Bercker, Kevelaer 2019, .
 Kaleidoskop der umarmenden Liebe : Zugänge zur Erfahrung des Umfangenseins von Christus. Regensburger philosophisch-theologische Schriften, Friedrich Pustet Verlag, Regensburg 2021, .
 Make Your own day : with your own ideas. Norderstedt 2021, .
 Lebendiges Licht: Die Engel als Wegweiser zum Sinn in der Schau Hildegards von Bingen. Verlagsbuchhandlung Sabat, Kulmbach 2021, .
 Lichtwege : Aphorismen im Kirchenjahr. Verlagsbuchhandlung Sabat, Kulmbach 2021, .

Contributions in book publications (selektion)

 Die Kompositionen der Hildegard von Bingen : Ein Forschungsbericht. In: Beiträge zur Gregorianik. 22. ConBrio Verlagsgesellschaft, Regensburg 1996, . p. 74–85.
 Auf der Suche nach der Stimme des lebendigen Geistes : Die Musik Hildegards von Bingen als Sinnbild vollendeter Schöpfung. In: Edeltraut Forster (editor): Hildegard von Bingen : Prophetin durch die Zeiten. Herder, Freiburg im Breisgau 1997, p. 334–339.
 Musik im 12. Jahrhundert. In: Hans-Jürgen Kotzur: Hildegard von Bingen 1098 – 1179. Verlag Philipp von Zabern, Mainz 1998, p. 178–181.
 Musik in Kirchen und Klöstern. In: Jahrbuch der Erzdiözese Bamberg 2006. Heinrichs-Verlag Bamberg 2005, p. 33–37.
 Die Chöre der Engel und der Teufel im Chorgestühl – die Grundlagen der mittelalterlichen Musikpraxis. In: Ludger Stühlmeyer (editor): Stationen der Kirchenmusik im Erzbistum Bamberg. Bamberg 2007.
 Die Seele klingt wie ein Lied – Hildegard von Bingen und die Musik. In: Information und Material. Hildegard von Bingen – Theologische, didaktische und spirituelle Impulse. Institut of Religionspädagogik Freiburg, 2012 no. 4055, p. 29–32.
 Gottesrede: Ermutigende Orientierung in Krisenzeiten bei Hildegard von Bingen. Pilgern im Todesschatten, die Klage der Elemente und Aufblick zum Licht oder: sci vias lucis in statu deficienti, in: Joachim Werz (Hg.): Gottesrede in Epidemien. Theologie und Kirche in der Krise. Aschendorff Verlag, Münster 2021, .

Newspaper articles (selektion)
 Series about Hildegard of Bingen (2011): Stark und Gottverliebt (18 September), Von der Eremitin zum Superstar (Oktober 23), Klartext geredet, trotzdem gefragt (Oktober 30), Von Dinkelbrei und Chalzedon (6 November), Einmal Himmel und zurück (13 November), Gut und Böse im Gespräch (20 November), Gotteslob aus Frauenhand (27 November). In: church magazine from Austria.
 Mythos, Logos, Therapie. In: Die Tagespost, Oktober 14, 2015.
 An interview with Philip Carr-Gomm. In: Karfunkel 120, 2015.
 Wegschauen geht nicht. An interview with Günter Wallraff for his 75. birthday. In: Die Tagespost, 30 September 2017, p. 10.

Lyrics for musical works
 Text for the song Glaubend leben im Alltag in the occasion of the 1000th anniversary of the Roman Catholic Archdiocese of Bamberg. First performance: 2007. In: Kirchenmusik im Erzbistum Bamberg, no. 44, Juli 2007 p. 11 und Heinrichsblatt, no. 31, Bamberg August 2007.
 Libretto for opera "Martin Luther" by Bernfried E. G. Pröve, a play about the reformer Martin Luther. First performance: 2017 Germany.
 Text for the song Ein Lied für Elisabeth, in: Elisabeth von Thüringen. Topos Plus Verlagsgemeinschaft, Kevelaer 2018, .

Discography
Scientific tutoring and booklet:
 Hildegard von Bingen : Femina Forma Maria. Marienlieder des Villarenser Kodex. Ensemble Mediatrix, conductor Johannes Berchmans Göschl. Calig, Augsburg 1996.
 Hildegard von Bingen : O vis aeternitatis. Vesper in der Abtei St. Hildegard. Schola of the Benediktinabby St. Hildegard, Eibingen, conductor Johannes Berchmans Göschl, Sr. Christiane Rath OSB. Ars Musici, Freiburg 1997.
 Hildegard von Bingen : Saints. Ensemble Sequentia, Barbara Thornton and Benjamin Bagby. BMG 1998.
 Hildegard von Bingen : Ordo virtutum – ein mittelalterliches Mysterienspiel. Ensemble A Cappella, Köln, conductor Dirk van Betteray. OKK, Waldbröl 1998.
 Hildegard von Bingen : Ordo virtutum. Cantoria Alberto Grau, conductor Johannes Berchmans Göschl. Legato 1999.
 Lilium. Ensemble Cosmedin, Stephanie and Christoph Haas. Animato 2001.
 Seraphim : Hildegard von Bingen. Ensemble Cosmedin, Stephanie and Christoph Haas. Animato 2005.
 Rose van Jhericho : Das Liederbuch der Anna von Köln (um 1500). Ars Choralis Coeln, conductor Maria Jonas. Raumklang 2007.
 Quinta Essentia. Ensemble Cosmedin, Stephanie and Christoph Haas. Animato 2007.
 Ein Hofer Königspaar : Die Orgeln in St. Marien und St. Michaelis. Rondeau Production, Leipzig 2012.
 Hildegard von Bingen : Celestial Hierarchy. Sequentia, conductor Benjamin Bagby, German Harmonia Mundi (Sony) 2013.
 Anima : Sakrale Musik aus der Fülle der Zeiten. Ensemble Cosmedin, Stephanie and Christoph Haas. Eos 2020.

References

Sources
 Dorothea Weiler: Auf der Suche nach der Stimme des lebendigen Geistes : Barbara Stühlmeyer forscht über die Musik der Hildegard von Bingen. In: Heinrichsblatt, no. 16, Bamberg, 19 April 1998.
 Franziska Hanel: Lieder und Bilder – Hildegard von Bingen als zentraler Punkt im Leben zweier Frauen: Barbara Stühlmeyer und Sabine Böhm. In: Frankenpost. Hof, 18 September 2004.
 Hanna Stank: Gemeindeleben als Abenteuer. In: Frankenpost. Hof, 9 November 2010. 
 Claudia Beckers-Dohlen: Karfunkel-Autoren im Porträt: Dr. Barbara Stühlmeyer. In: Karfunkel, no. 96, Oktober 2011, p. 63.
 Beate Franz: Leben wie der heilige Benedikt. Portrait about the Benediktineroblate Dr. Barbara Stühlmeyer. In: Frankenpost. Hof, 23 Dezember 2012, p. 2.

External links
 
 Literature by and about Barbara Stühlmeyer in the Bavarian National Library catalogue
 Literature by and about Barbara Stühlmeyer in the Digital Library
 Barbara Stühlmeyer in Google Scholar
 Literature by and about Barbara Stühlmeyer in the professional journal Musica sacra
 Website Healthy Hildegard
 Cyclopedic entry off Hildegard von Bingen by Barbara Stühlmeyers Die Gesänge der Hildegard von Bingen. (2003), in MUGI – Musik and Gender.
 Onlineportal explizit.net Literature by Barbara Stühlmeyer above Hildegard von Bingen

1964 births
Living people
Christian philosophers
German music historians
Writers from Bremen
Writers from Bavaria
German women children's writers
University of Münster alumni
University of the Arts Bremen alumni
German women historians